Tuapeka is a former parliamentary electorate in the Otago region of New Zealand, from 1871 to 1911.

Population centres
The 1870 electoral redistribution was undertaken by a parliamentary select committee based on population data from the 1867 New Zealand census. Eight sub-committees were formed, with two members each making decisions for their own province; thus members set their own electorate boundaries. The number of electorates was increased from 61 to 72, and Tuapeka was one of the new electorates. The Tuapeka electorate was landlocked and inland from the  electorate. The town of Lawrence was within the electorate.

In the 1875 electoral redistribution, the electorate's area was unaltered, but boundary changes were introduced in subsequent electoral redistributions. In the 1890 electoral redistribution, the electorate moved further inland and the settlements of Tapanui and Roxburgh were gained. In the 1892 electoral redistribution, the electorate moved further inland again and Tapanui was lost again, but Alexandra was gained. In the 1907 electoral redistribution, the shape of the electorate changed significantly, and Lawrence was lost to the Bruce electorate, but large areas were gained from the  electorate, including Ranfurly.

In the 1911 electoral redistribution, the Tuapeka electorate was abolished, and the vast majority of its area went to the  electorate.

History
From 1855 to 1862 Vincent Pyke represented Castlemaine and Castlemaine Boroughs in the Victorian Legislative Assembly.

Members of Parliament
Key

Election results

1908 by-election

1899 election

1898 by-election

1894 by-election

1890 election

Notes

References

Historical electorates of New Zealand
1870 establishments in New Zealand
1911 disestablishments in New Zealand
Politics of Otago